Southwest Maluku Regency is a regency of Maluku Province, Indonesia. It comprises a number of islands and island groups in the south of the province, including (running from west to east) Lirang Island, Wetar Island (with almost half of the total land area of the regency), Kisar Island, Romang Island, the Letti Islands, the Damer Islands, Mdona Hyera (formerly called the Sermata Islands) and the Babar Islands. The administrative centre lies at Tiakur on Moa Island (in the Letti Islands), but the largest town is Wonreli (on Kisar Island).

Administrative Districts 

As at 2010 the Southwest Maluku Regency was administratively composed of eight districts (kecamatan). But by 2015 the number of districts had increased to seventeen by the splitting of existing districts; Pulau Pulau Wetar (the Wetar Islands) has been divided into four districts - Wetar, Wetar Barat (West Wetar), Wetar Timur (East Wetar) and Wetar Utara (North Wetar); the other six newly created districts are Dawelor Dawera and Pulau Masela (Masela Island) formed from parts of Babar Timur District, Kepulauan Romang (Romang Islands) and Kisar Utara (North Kisar) formed from parts of Pulau Pulau Terselatan District, Pulau Lakor (Lakor Island) formed from part of Moa Lakor District, and Pulau Wetang (Wetang Island) formed from part of Pulau Pulau Babar District.

The districts are formally grouped into three archipelagoes - the Terselatan Group (including Wetar, as well as Kisar and Romang Islands), the Lemola Group (Letti, Moa and Lakor) and the Babar Group (including the Damer and Sermata Islands). The areas (in km2) and the populations at the 2010 census and 2020 census, together with the official estimates as at mid 2021, are listed below. The table also includes the number of administrative villages (rural desa and urban kelurahan) in each district, and its post code.

Notes: (a) the 2010 populations for the four districts which comprised Pulau Pulau Wetar District are listed under the first district. (b) the 2010 populations of Kisar Utara and Kepulauan Romang Districts are included under the figure for Pulau Pulau Terselatan District, from which they were split off. (c) the 2010 population of Lakor District is included in the figure for Moa Lakor District, from which it was split off. (d) the 2010 population of Pulau Wetang District is included in the figure for Pulau Pulau Babar District, from which it was split off. (e) the 2010 populations of Pulau Masela and Daweloor Dawera Districts are included under the figure for Babar Timur District, from which they were split off.

References

External links

Regencies of Maluku (province)